Zorino is a rural locality in Polevskoy Selsoviet Rural Settlement, Kursky District, Kursk Oblast, Russia. Population:

Geography 
The village is located on the Seym River (a left tributary of the Desna), 104 km from the Russia–Ukraine border, 28 km south-east of the district center – the town Kursk, 5 km from the selsoviet center – Polevaya.

 Climate
Zorino has a warm-summer humid continental climate (Dfb in the Köppen climate classification).

Transport 
Zorino is located 7 km from the federal route  (Kursk – Voronezh –  "Kaspy" Highway; a part of the European route ), 3 km from the road of regional importance  (Kursk – Bolshoye Shumakovo – Polevaya via Lebyazhye), 5 km from the road  (R-298 – Polevaya), on the road of intermunicipal significance  (38K-014 – Demino), 4 km from the nearest railway halt Gutorovo (railway line Klyukva — Belgorod).

The rural locality is situated 27 km from Kursk Vostochny Airport, 107 km from Belgorod International Airport and 184 km from Voronezh Peter the Great Airport.

References

Notes

Sources

Rural localities in Kursky District, Kursk Oblast